Klaus Wanger (born 24 February 1941) was Speaker of the Landtag of Liechtenstein (the national Parliament) from January 2001 to February 2009. 

He represented the Schaan electoral district and is a member of the Progressive Citizens' Party. He was first elected to Liechtenstein's Parliament in 1993, having previously pursued a business career.

References

External links
Liechtenstein political leaders

Members of the Landtag of Liechtenstein
Speakers of the Landtag of Liechtenstein
Living people
Progressive Citizens' Party politicians
1941 births